Hudghton is a surname. Notable people with the surname include:

Ian Hudghton (born 1951), Scottish politician
Max Hudghton (born 1976), Australian rules footballer

See also
Hughton